Viscum exile is a species of mistletoe in the family Santalaceae. It is a parasitic plant native to Sulawesi.

References

External links
Viscum exile occurrence data from GBIF

exile
Parasitic plants
Taxa named by Bryan Alwyn Barlow
Plants described in 1996